Mutiat Yewande Isola, professionally known as Wande, is a Nigerian American Christian hip hop artist, actress and former journalist and A&R administrator from Austin, Texas, United States. She signed to the Christian hip hop label Reach Records in 2019, where she had worked as an A&R administrator. Prior to that, as an independent artist, from 2013 through 2018 she released multiple singles and made numerous featured appearances on various songs, as well as worked as a music journalist. She is the first woman signed to Reach. Her debut extended play (EP), Exit, was released on April 24, 2020, followed by a mini-EP The Decision on December 4, 2020.

Biography

Early life 
Wande was born in Nigeria but raised in Round Rock and then Austin, Texas, United States. In addition to English, she is fluent in Yoruba. Most of her family was Muslim, except for her mother, who was Christian. At first she was not allowed to go to church, and then started having to get up at 5 A.M. to read the Bible and go with her mother to work so that she could get picked up to go to church. Wande said in April 2020 that she used to joke "that I'd go to Mosque and church". Her curiosity about God led her to search on the internet for Christian rap, and the first result to come up was the 2006 song "Prayin' for You" by Lecrae. In sixth grade, she started playing the flute and studied music through junior high school. She converted to Christianity in seventh grade while interning at a camp in 2009 in Columbus, Texas, a decision for which she encountered opposition from within her family. While at the camp, she also saw a performance by the Christian hip hop collective 116 Clique, which at that time consisted of Lecrae, Trip Lee, Tedashii, and Sho Baraka.

Early career 
Despite this initial interest in music, Wande wanted to be a doctor, and enrolled in a health and science program in junior high school. She became interested in rapping after a biology teacher allowed her to compose a rap about cellular transport instead of writing an essay or making a presentation. Despite this, she initially continued in studying health and sciences, even acquiring a license to be a nurse's aid. According to Wande, she had "an internal struggle with the whole rap thing. Africans don’t really mess with creative careers. You either become a doctor or a lawyer." However, she decided to switch majors and went into journalism and public relations at University of Texas at Austin. As a journalist, she anticipated that she could get access to artists, attend concerts, and conduct interviews. She soon started writing for the Christian hip hop website Rapzilla, and started assisting the Christian hip hop record label RMG. She rapped at campus events as a form of Christian ministry. She was a member of the Alpha Kappa Alpha and Sigma Phi Lambda sororities, the National Association of Black Journalists, IGotSole Dance Company, and the Texas Orange Jackets. Her first released record was a feature on the song "B.I.G." by D-Flow on their 2013 album Quarter to Vinci. She released her first single, "No Flex" featuring ikilledmarlon, in May 2016. She performed at South by Southwest in 2016, 2017, and 2018. She did some A&R work for Ace Harris, and 2017, while still pursuing her university education, she began an internship at Reach Records. She released eleven songs during 2018, making the Rapzilla list of 15 Freshman of 2019. Shortly before her graduation in 2018 she was hired as an administrator for the label's A&R.

Reach Records (2018—present) 
The following year, after five months after her hire as A&R, she was signed as a recording artist to Reach. She released her debut single on the label, "Blessed Up", in April. The single would be listed the next year on Michelle Obama's playlist. Wande is the first woman signed to the label. She has expressed a hope that her signing will make it easier for other women rappers to pursue a career in the highly male-dominated Christian hip hop genre. "I think it’ll show other labels that you shouldn’t be afraid to sign females. I hear a lot of excuses like, 'Oh it’s expensive' or 'Oh, we don’t know how the market will react to a woman.' 'Will they buy her music?' Obviously, a lot of Christian companies don’t have the money to just casually experiment with a Christian artist because you have to make sure they are profitable. So a lot of women get the short end of the stick because they don’t want to gamble on a woman." She said that it initially took a while for her music to be released because of resistance that she encountered in the music industry because her abilities were undervalued on account of her being a woman. For example, she recounts that "I would fly somewhere, write a whole album, and would ask for the beat and the person wouldn’t send the song. I learned a lot about how people value you." She also has mentioned the difficulty in getting exposure to her music when her lyrics do not discuss sex. "Even artists like Cardi B have mentioned that they’ve tested it out and people will blast the sexual songs and go 'eh what is this' to the songs with a deeper meaning."

On March 30, 2020, Wande announced her forthcoming extended play, Exit, and the single "Happy" was released April 3, 2020. "Be the Light", featuring Evan and Eris, followed as a single on April 17, 2020. Exit was released on April 24, 2020. Wande also has released music has part of 116 (formerly 116 Clique). She said in an April 2020 interview that her father and her have made peace over her conversion and her decision to pursue a hip-hop music career. On December 4, 2020, she released a three-song mini-EP entitled The Decision. In the spring of 2022, she married Darius Dees.
GOD IS SO GOOD!!!! AMEN

Discography

Albums

EPs

Singles

As primary artist

As featured artist

Other appearances

Music videos

As lead artist

As featured artist

Filmography

References

Notes

Citations

Rappers from Austin
Nigerian women rappers
Nigerian emigrants to the United States
American women rappers
Reach Records artists
A&R people
American people of Yoruba descent
University of Texas at Austin alumni
1996 births
Living people
Yoruba musicians
Alpha Kappa Alpha members
Rappers from Round Rock
Sigma Phi Lambda
21st-century American women musicians